Đorđe Jokić (Serbian Cyrillic: Ђорђе Јокић; born 20 January 1981) is a Serbian former professional footballer. He played as a defender most of career.

Club career
Jokić began playing football with Bane, before transferring to OFK Beograd in the 2000–01 season. In early 2005, Jokić moved to Russia and signed a three-year contract with Torpedo Moscow.

On 14 July 2012, Jokić signed a two-year contract with Vojvodina.

International career
Jokić was a member of the team that represented Serbia and Montenegro at the 2004 Summer Olympics. They exited after the first round, finishing fourth in their group behind Argentina, Australia and Tunisia.

Jokić also made four appearances for the senior national team of Serbia and Montenegro between 2004 and 2005.

Career statistics

Club

International

References

External links

 
 Sportbox profile  
 
 

1981 births
Living people
People from Raška, Serbia
Serbian footballers
Association football defenders
Serbia and Montenegro international footballers
Serbia and Montenegro under-21 international footballers
Olympic footballers of Serbia and Montenegro
Footballers at the 2004 Summer Olympics
FK Bane players
OFK Beograd players
FK Vojvodina players
Serbian SuperLiga players
FC Torpedo Moscow players
FC Tom Tomsk players
FC Dynamo Bryansk players
Russian Premier League players
Serbia and Montenegro expatriate footballers
Serbia and Montenegro footballers
Serbian expatriate footballers
Expatriate footballers in Russia
Serbia and Montenegro expatriate sportspeople in Russia
Serbian expatriate sportspeople in Russia